Brearton is a village and civil parish in the Harrogate borough of North Yorkshire, England, situated about  north of Knaresborough. The village is mentioned in the Domesday Book and its name derives from the Old English Brer-Tun, which means the town where the briars grew.

According to the 2001 census it had a population of 141 increasing at the 2011 census to 146, however, in 2015, North Yorkshire County Council estimated the population to be 150. This small village has just over 40 houses that are situated quite close together. The fields surrounding the village show evidence of Medieval farming. Brearton is located at the end of the road from Nidd and Scotton; it is only accessible by vehicle from the west.

Whilst the village is popular for walkers, there are no shops, but there is one pub, The Malt Shovel, which The Guardian described as having "the best Sunday Lunches in Yorkshire."

References

Villages in North Yorkshire
Civil parishes in North Yorkshire